The Southland Times is the regional daily paper for Southland, including Invercargill, and neighbouring parts of Otago, in New Zealand. It is now owned by media business Stuff Ltd, formerly the New Zealand division of Fairfax Media.

History

The Southland Times was first established in 1862. The first edition was published on 12 November 1862 under the title of Invercargill Times. The three founders were Gerard George Fitzgerald, John T. Downes, and Charles Reynolds. The name changed to The Southland Times in June 1864. Initially, it was published two or three times a week until it became a daily paper in 1875. From 1869 until its purchase by the INL (Independent Newspapers Limited), it was owned by the Gilmour family. Robert Gilmour became a part owner in 1869–70, and then in 1879 became the sole owner of the paper.

In 1972, digital computers and software, phototypesetters, and a Japanese APR photopolymer plate were installed at the paper, making the Times New Zealand's first fully computerised newspaper production system under the direction of Ian Gilmour.

The paper changed hands again on 1 July 2003, when Independent Newspapers Limited was purchased by Australian media company Fairfax Media.

In May 2012 local printing of The Southland Times ceased with all printing now taking place from Allied Press in Dunedin. Smaller community papers that are usually printed once a week are now printed from Christchurch.

In July 2015 The Southland Times building located on Esk Street was sold to the Invercargill Licensing Trust.  A year later The Southland Times relocated to a new building on the corner of Don and Deveron street.  In 2017 the Invercargill City Council and HWR Group formed HWCP Management Limited with the purpose of redeveloping the Invercargill CDB. The Southland Times building and most buildings on the city block surrounding Dee Street, Tay Street, Kelvin Street and Esk Street were purchased by HWCP with the intentions of redeveloping the city block into an innercity mall.  Plans for the new mall were first unvieled in 2018 and in 2019 an announcement was made that The Southland Times building would be demolished but the building facade retained, a Farmers Department store would be built on The Southland Times building site as the anchor tennant in the mall. The demolition of the city block began in January 2020 and construction began in October 2020. In November 2021 current and former staff from The Southland Times were invited to sign the rear of The Southland Times building facade prior to the facade being plastered.  On July 14 2022 the first stage of the Invercargill Central Mall was opened including the Farmers Department store.

Awards and nominations 
At the 2018 Voyager Media Awards The Southland Times''' photographer Kavinda Herath won the Best Photo (Junior) Award.

Other publicationsThe Southland Times also publishes:

The EyeThe Eye is distributed weekly in the area surrounding Invercargill and Winton.

NewslinkNewslink is distributed weekly in the area surrounding Gore and Eastern Southland.

The MirrorThe Mirror is published weekly on Wednesdays in two editions: one for the Queenstown Lakes District and another for Central Otago.

Otago Southland Farmer
The Otago Southland Farmer is delivered fortnightly to all rural homes in Southland and Otago.

Auto XtraAuto Xtra is an A4 glossy car publication, published fortnightly on a Monday, inserted into The Southland Times'', and distributed to retail outlets in Invercargill.

References

External links
 Southland Times Website

Southland, New Zealand
Stuff (company)
Publications established in 1862
Newspapers published in New Zealand
Mass media in Invercargill
1862 establishments in New Zealand
Organisations based in Invercargill